Notonecta insulata is a species of backswimmer in the family Notonectidae. It is found in North America.

References

Notonecta
Articles created by Qbugbot
Insects described in 1837